Mossend railway station served the town of Mossend, North Lanarkshire, Scotland, from 1843 to 1962 on the Wishaw and Coltness Railway.

History

First station
The first station was opened as Holytown on 8 May 1843 by the Wishaw and Coltness Railway, although it had opened earlier to goods on 25 January 1834. It was replaced by a new station to the north on 1 June 1882.

Second station
The second station opened on 1 June 1882 by the Caledonian Railway. It had four platforms whereas the original station had two. On the west side was the goods yard, called Mossend Goods. The west platforms closed in 1903 enabling easy access to Mossend Marshalling Yard. The station closed on 5 November 1962.

References 

Disused railway stations in North Lanarkshire
Railway stations in Great Britain opened in 1843
Railway stations in Great Britain closed in 1962
1843 establishments in Scotland
1962 disestablishments in Scotland